The 2010 Tongan Legislative Assembly was established following the 2010 elections, the first under a new system which saw the majority of seats elected by universal suffrage. The Taimi Media Network described it as "Tonga's first democratically elected Parliament".

The Speaker of the 2010 Assembly was Lord Lasike, until he lost his seat in Parliament on 18 July 2012, following conviction for illicit ammunitions ownership. He was replaced as Speaker by Lord Fakafanua. The Deputy Speaker was initially Lord Tuʻiʻafitu, until he was appointed Minister for Health on 2 July 2012, whereupon he was replaced by Lord Tu'iha'teiho.

Initial party standings

|-
! style="background-color:#E9E9E9;text-align:left;vertical-align:top;" width=420|Parties
! style="background-color:#E9E9E9;text-align:right;" |Votes
! style="background-color:#E9E9E9;text-align:right;" |%
! style="background-color:#E9E9E9;text-align:right;" |Seats
|-
| style="text-align:left;" |Democratic Party of the Friendly Islands
| style="text-align:right;" |10,953
| style="text-align:right;" |28.49
| style="text-align:right;" |12
|-
| style="text-align:left;" |Independents
| style="text-align:right;" |25,873
| style="text-align:right;" |67.30
| style="text-align:right;" |5 
|-
| style="text-align:left;" |People's Democratic Party
| style="text-align:right;" |934
| style="text-align:right;" |2.43
| style="text-align:right;" |0
|-
| style="text-align:left;" |Sustainable Nation-Building Party
| style="text-align:right;" |519
| style="text-align:right;" |1.35
| style="text-align:right;" |0
|-
| style="text-align:left;" |Tongan Democratic Labor Party
| style="text-align:right;" |168
| style="text-align:right;" |0.44
| style="text-align:right;" |0
|-
| style="text-align:left;" |Noble representatives
| style="text-align:right;" |54
| style="text-align:right;" |—
| style="text-align:right;" |9
|-
|style="text-align:left;background-color:#E9E9E9"|Total 
|width="75" style="text-align:right;background-color:#E9E9E9"| 38,447
|width="30" style="text-align:right;background-color:#E9E9E9"| 100.00
|width="30" style="text-align:right;background-color:#E9E9E9"| 26
|-
|colspan=4|Source: 
|}

Members

Initial MPs

Summary of changes
 On 8 December 2010, Sosefo Vakata, People's Representative for Ongo Niua 17, left the Democratic Party of the Friendly Islands, to sit as an independent.
 On 24 July 2011, Kaveinga Faʻanunu, People's Representative for Tongatapu 9, a first term MP from the Democratic Party of the Friendly Islands, died of cancer. A by-election for Tongatapu 9 was held on 15 September 2011, and the seat was retained by the Democratic Party, through its candidate Falisi Tupou.
 On 18 July 2012, Lord Lasike, Nobles' Representative for ʻEua and Speaker of the Assembly, lost his seat by order of the King in application of the Constitution, following his conviction in court for illegal possession of firearms munitions. He was replaced by Lord Nuku in a by-election on 2 August.
 Lord Fusituaʻa, Nobles' Representative for the Niuas, died on 24 April 2014. His son Mataʻiʻulua ʻi Fonuamotu inherited his title on 6 May. The new Lord Fusituaʻa won his father's seat in Parliament through a by-election on 22 May.

References

Politics of Tonga
Political organisations based in Tonga